Banffshire was a constituency of the House of Commons of Great Britain from 1708 to 1800, and of the House of Commons of the Parliament of the United Kingdom from 1801 to 1983. It elected one Member of Parliament (MP), using the first-past-the-post voting system.

Creation
The British parliamentary constituency was created in 1708 following the Acts of Union, 1707 and replaced the former Parliament of Scotland shire constituency of Banffshire.

History
The constituency elected one Member of Parliament (MP) by the first past the post system until 1983 when it was split and merged into Moray and Banff and Buchan.

The constituency covered the county of Banffshire, Scotland, but until 1918 the county town of Banff and the burgh of Cullen were represented as part of Elgin Burghs.

Members of Parliament

Election results

Elections in the 1830s

Elections in the 1840s

Elections in the 1850s

Duff resigned by accepting the office of Steward of the Manor of Hempholme, causing a by-election.

Back to Election results

Elections in the 1860s
Duff's resignation caused a by-election.

Back to Election results

Elections in the 1870s

Back to Election results

Elections in the 1880s

Duff was appointed a Lord Commissioner of the Treasury, requiring a by-election.

Duff was appointed Civil Lord of the Admiralty, requiring a by-election.

Back to Election results

Elections in the 1890s

Back to Election results

Elections in the 1900s

Back to Election results

Elections in the 1910s

General Election 1914–15:

Another General Election was required to take place before the end of 1915. The political parties had been making preparations for an election to take place and by the July 1914, the following candidates had been selected; 
Liberal: Walter Waring
Unionist: Edward Archibald Hume

Back to Election results

Elections in the 1920s

Back to Election results

Elections in the 1930s

General Election 1939–40

Another General Election was required to take place before the end of 1940. The political parties had been making preparations for an election to take place and by the Autumn of 1939, the following candidates had been selected; 
Unionist: William Lindsay
Liberal: Murdoch McKenzie Wood
Labour: George A Mair
Back to Election results

Elections in the 1940s

Back to Election results

Elections in the 1950s

 

Back to Election results

Elections in the 1960s

Back to Election results

Elections in the 1970s

Back to Top

References

Politics of the county of Banff
Politics of Aberdeenshire
Politics of Moray
Historic parliamentary constituencies in Scotland (Westminster)
Constituencies of the Parliament of the United Kingdom established in 1708
Constituencies of the Parliament of the United Kingdom disestablished in 1983